Daniel Končal (born 16 September 1982) is a Slovak volleyball player for VK Karlovarsko and the Slovak national team.

He participated at the 2017 Men's European Volleyball Championship.

References

1982 births
Living people
Slovak men's volleyball players
Slovak expatriate sportspeople in the Czech Republic
Expatriate volleyball players in the Czech Republic